Trio Voronezh is a Russian folk music band. This band, known for its conventional usage of Russian musical instruments and folk melodies, is composed of three men: Vladimir Volokhin on the domra, Sergei Teleshev on the bayan, and Valerie Petrukhin on the double-bass balalaika. Trio Voronezh is named due to its founders all being graduates of the Academy of Music in Voronezh.

Origin
The trio was founded in 1993, when three young men formed a folk music trio, and began to play traditional Russian folk tunes in small concert halls in Germany, the Netherlands, and France. The instruments employed are the domra, the bajan, and the double-bass balalaika, which match the Russian tunes by providing the music with its customary Russian tune.  Among the Russian folks songs played by the trio are some songs by  Johann Sebastian Bach, Antonio Vivaldi, Tchaikovsky and Franz Schubert along with some contemporary favorites such as "Besame Mucho".

Debut
The band made its U.S. debut in 1996 at the Oregon Bach Festival, where the tunes that the trio struck were held in high regards with the crowds. Since that concert, the trio's career has continued to rise, with live concerts in Europe, a music video filmed in the USA, and their return to the Oregon Bach Festival in 1997 and 1999. 

Prior to their 1998 U.S. tour, Trio Voronezh made an appearance on public radio's A Prairie Home Companion with Garrison Keillor. The trio went on to perform at Houston's Society for the Performing Arts; the cities of Ann Arbor, Chicago, Portland, and St. Louis; and the Universities of Arizona, Georgia, Illinois, Nebraska, and Los Angeles, as well as Amherst, Dartmouth College, New York's Rockefeller University and Stanford.

Recent times
In 2003, the trio made its debut in the orchestral persuasion with the Phoenix Symphony in a highly successful collaboration with Doc Severinsen. During the 2003-2004 season, Trio Voronezh performed with the Colorado Symphony Orchestra, the Minnesota Orchestra, and in numerous recitals across the country.

Other collaborations
Trio Voronezh provided the background music on a computer animated short, Bert
In 2007, Trio Voronezh performed with Ballet Fantastique at the Hult Center in Eugene, Oregon

External links
 

Russian musical groups
Contemporary classical music ensembles
Musical trios